A by-election was held for the New South Wales Legislative Assembly electorate of Gordon on 24 September 1938 because the Court of Disputed Returns overturned the result of the 1938 Gordon election. Harry Turner had been declared elected by 9 votes over William Milne. Both candidates were endorsed by the United Australia Party. Milne filed a petition which challenged postal and absentee votes. Justice Maxwell sitting as the Court of Disputed Returns held that most of the 125 challenged votes did not meet the requirement of the Electoral Act such as not being properly witnessed, and that the election was void.

Dates

Result

 

The by-election was held because the Court of Disputed Returns declared that the election of Harry Turner at the 1938 Gordon election was void.

See also
Electoral results for the district of Gordon
List of New South Wales state by-elections

References

1938 elections in Australia
New South Wales state by-elections
1930s in New South Wales